Frederick Joseph Kenney, Jr. is a retired American rear admiral who was formerly the Judge Advocate General of the United States Coast Guard, the highest-ranking attorney in the Coast Guard.  In that role, he was responsible for over 180 uniformed and 90 civilian lawyers.  He is currently the director of legal and external affairs at the International Maritime Organization (IMO), London, United Kingdom.

Biography
Kenney is a graduate of Michigan State University and the University of San Francisco School of Law. He was commissioned in 1981 through Officer Candidate School. Some of his notable assignments include chief of the Office of Maritime and International Law, staff judge advocate of the First Coast Guard District, judge of the Coast Guard Court of Criminal Appeals, and commanding officer of the Coast Guard Pacific Area Tactical Law Enforcement Team. He is also an adjunct professor at Georgetown University Law Center.

References
 

Year of birth missing (living people)
Living people
American military lawyers
United States Coast Guard admirals
Judge Advocates General of the United States Coast Guard
Michigan State University alumni
University of San Francisco School of Law alumni
Georgetown University Law Center faculty
International Maritime Organization people